Linard Gonthier (1565 – after 1642) was a glass painter who worked in Troyes, France. Among his many works, he undertook the restoration of the stained glass in the church of Sainte-Savine.

The Rue Linard Gonthier in Troyes is named after him.

Works
Stained glass window The Mystical Winepress, from the medieval image of Christ in the winepress, in the fourth chapel along the north aisle of Troyes Cathedral, dated 1625, showing a vine springing from Christ's chest, with the apostles issuing from its flowers (see image)
Pau, Pyrénées-Atlantiques, Musée national du château de Pau, Henri IV terrassant un centaure et la Bataille d’Ivry, double-sided drawing, dated 1610, box of stained glass for the Arquebuse Hotel in Troyes, engraved by Hogenberg
Troyes, Musée des Beaux-Arts, Un Arquebusier, achat de la ville à la vente Lebrun-Dalbanne, 29 mai 1884, n° 67, Troyes.

References

French stained glass artists and manufacturers
1565 births
Year of death unknown